William Dean Reynolds (July 20, 1931December 2, 2002) was a professional American football halfback in the National Football League (NFL) and the American Football League (AFL). He played for the NFL's Cleveland Browns (1953–1957) and Pittsburgh Steelers (1958) and the AFL's Oakland Raiders (1960).

External links
 

1931 births
2002 deaths
People from St. Marys, West Virginia
Players of American football from West Virginia
American football halfbacks
Pittsburgh Panthers football players
Cleveland Browns players
Pittsburgh Steelers players
Oakland Raiders players
American Football League players